Arhopala khamti , Doherty's dull oakblue, is a butterfly in the family Lycaenidae. It was described by William Doherty in 1891. It is found in the Indomalayan realm (Sikkim, Assam, Thailand, Hainan).

References

External links
Arhopala Boisduval, 1832 at Markku Savela's Lepidoptera and Some Other Life Forms. Retrieved June 3, 2017.

Arhopala
Butterflies described in 1891